Hans Podlipnik Castillo and Andrei Vasilevski were the defending champions but only Vasilevski chose to defend his title, partnering Vladyslav Manafov. Vasilevski lost in the first round to Federico Gaio and Enrique López Pérez.

Sanjar Fayziev and Jurabek Karimov won the title after defeating Gaio and López Pérez 6–2, 6–7(3–7), [11–9] in the final.

Seeds

Draw

References
 Main Draw

Tashkent Challenger - Doubles
2018 Doubles